WRMT (1490 AM) is a radio station broadcasting a beach music format. Licensed to Rocky Mount, North Carolina, United States, it serves the Rocky Mount area.  The station is currently owned by First Media Radio, LLC. The station briefly aired gospel programming originating from Praise City Church.

On February 14, 2020 WRMT became 1490 "The Beach" and plays Carolina Beach music.

History
In 2005, this station was ESPN Radio 1490 and aired high school sports.

In 2018, WRMT once again began to broadcast Rocky Mount High School football games.

Previous logo

References

External links

RMT